was a Japanese government entity that existed between 1868 and 1943.

History

When the prefecture was established with the merger of the two shogunate city administrations in the Meiji restoration in 1868, Tokyo initially consisted only of the former city area of the shogunate capital Edo. Beginning in 1871, the territory of Tokyo was expanded beyond Edo in several steps to reach roughly its present extent with the Tama transfer in 1893.  The surrounding former shogunate domain (incl. hatamoto fiefs) in Musashi province was initially administrated by Musashi governors, but then split up between the prefectures Shinagawa, Kosuge and Ōmiya/Urawa. In 1871/72, the surrounding rural areas from these three prefectures and the Setagaya exclave of Hikone ex-domain/prefecture were merged into Tokyo.

The "system of large and small/major and minor districts" (大区小区制, daiku-shōku-sei) which was tied to the modernized family registration system (koseki) created an (unpopular) subdivision of all prefectures into numbered subunits.

In 1878, the ancient ritsuryō districts were reactivated as administrative units in rural areas, and the status of urban districts (-ku) was newly introduced for major cities. Under the gunkuchōson-hensei-hō (郡区町村編制法, "Law on the organization of -gun/-ku/-chō/-son"), both urban and rural districts were further subdivided into urban and rural units (-machi and -mura, i.e. towns and villages in the countryside, but neighbourhood-sized units in larger settlements; for example, there were 13 -machi/-chō and 93 -mura in Ebara District in the 1870s, including five (one "North", three "South", one "New") for Shinagawa alone; the >100 subdivisions of Ebara were merged into only 1 town and 18 villages in 1889, today there are only four special wards left in its former territory: Shinagawa, Meguro, Ōta, Setagaya). Initially, Tokyo contained only six [rural] districts, but other rural areas were added to Tokyo later (Izu & Ogasawara islands 1878/80, the three Tama districts 1893).

When the modern municipalities were introduced in 1889, Tokyo was subdivided into c. 80 municipalities: 1 city, a handful of towns, and dozens of villages. With the Tama transfer of 1893, the number of municipalities in Tokyo grew to over 170. By 1943, there were only 87 municipalities left: 3 cities, 18 towns and 66 villages (see the List of mergers in Tokyo).

Even after the Tama transfer, Tokyo City remained the dominant part of Tokyo in terms of population and economic strength. That increased further during the progressing industrialization and the explosive growth of the city in the early 20th century, only temporarily set back by the devastation brought about by the 1923 Great Kantō earthquake. The outskirts grew, but eventually Tokyo City's dominance within Tokyo only increased again as many of the explosively grown suburbs were merged into Tokyo City in 1932, including some of the largest towns in Japanese history with over 100,000 inhabitants each such as West Sugamo in North Toshima District and Shibuya in Toyotama District.

Various plans for a unification of the prefectural and city government were discussed over the decades. An early proposal in the 1890s by then Home Minister Nomura Yasushi envisioned to separate the rural areas of Tokyo as Musashi prefecture and transform only Tokyo City into a "Metropolis", but it failed in the Imperial Diet. Some plans, especially those by the commoner political parties and during the "Taishō democracy" of the 1920s, envisioned a "Metropolis" more similar to a special city: an enlarged, prefecture-level city with more local autonomy. While the city did gain some additional authority under the 1922 "six major cities law" (more formally: 六大都市行政監督ニ関スル法律, roku-daitoshi gyōsei kantoku ni kan suru hōritsu, "Law relating to the administrative supervision of the six major cities"), and the governments made plans for a "Metropolis" system – the 1932 "Greater Tokyo City" mergers had been part of a Metropolis plan from the Tokyo City Assembly –, the actual reform was carried out later as part of the Tōjō cabinet's wartime authoritarian centralization measures (or "simplification of local government"). Not only was the Home Ministry control over prefectures and municipalities tightened as in the whole country – municipal mayors became appointive similar to the Meiji era –; Tokyo's prefectural government and Tokyo City's municipal government were indeed unified into one "Metropolitan" government, but under still tighter central government supervision.

The governor of Tokyo, previously chiji as in all prefectures, was now called chōkan ("head/chief" [often of a central government agency]) and tied even more closely to the Imperial government than the governors of other prefectures. He became a shinninkan (親任官), meaning he was appointed directly by the Emperor, in the same procedure as a member of the Cabinet, the governors of Chōsen/Korea or Taiwan/Formosa, or an Army General or Navy Admiral.

The "Metropolis" is not to be confused with the Tokyo metropolitan area which extends into prefectures other than Tokyo and, depending on definition, may or may not include all of the "Metropolis".

In 1944/45, the establishment of regional bureaus created new parallel local administrative structures, lacking even the limited control by elected assemblies that prefectures and municipalities featured. And on the local level, the pre-existing neighbourhood associations (see chōnaikai and Tonarigumi) had been tied into the totalitarian Yokusankai vision and were endowed with far-reaching authority to establish an authoritarian system of control reaching down even to individual citizens. But the war tide had turned, and soon, the occupation under Douglas MacArthur overturned the wartime centralization, and beyond that, introduced new far-reaching local autonomy rights for prefectures, municipalities and even citizens in the form of "direct demands" (chokusetsu seikyū: recalls, popular initiative referendums for prefectural/municipal by-laws [excluding taxation], petitions, etc.).

The title chōkan for the governor actually remained in place until 1947 when the Constitution and the Local Autonomy Law made Tokyo equal with other prefectures again and gave the residents of former Tokyo City (almost) the same rights as in other municipalities with the introduction of special wards. The first gubernatorial election, held in April 1947 as part of the 1st unified elections, was still held as Tōkyō-to chōkan senkyo, and the first elected governor (who had also been the penultimate appointed governor from 1946 to 1947) initially still took office as chōkan, but became chiji in May 1947.

References

Further reading
 
 Steiner, Kurt. (1965). Local Government in Japan.

External links
 Historical Development of Japanese Local Governance, Parts 1–4
 National Archives of Japan: 変貌–江戸から帝都そして首都へ– (henbō – Edo kara teito soshite shuto e –, "Transfiguration: From Edo to Imperial capital, then to [state/national] capital"; Japanese, includes some maps showing the territorial expansion 1868–1893 and the establishment of subdivisions of Tokyo)

 tokubetsu-ku kyōgikai (特別区協議会; "Conference of special wards"; an association of the 23 special wards/"cities" that cover former Tokyo City since 1947): 東京２３区のおいたち (Tōkyō-23ku no oitachi) (pdf; Japanese), retrieved 2019/06/22.
 Maps of prefectures and their districts and capitals in the Kantō region [without islands except for Izu's Great Island=present-day Ōshima Town] in Meiji 4 (1871/72), 1876, 1889, 1900

Former prefectures of Japan
1869 establishments in Japan
History of Tokyo
1943 disestablishments in Japan